The i-RAM is a solid-state storage device produced by Gigabyte and released in June 2005. It has four DDR RAM DIMM slots, and a connection via a SATA port enables a PC to see the i-RAM as a hard disk drive, which can also be made bootable. The SATA interface limits available bandwidth to a maximum sustained throughput of 150MB/s but allows latency of 0.1ms.

As the DRAM is a volatile memory, an integrated battery allows the contents of the DRAM to be preserved for a limited amount of time after the device's power supply is interrupted.

Features
The I-Ram has the advantages of a fast transfer rate and access time, no moving parts, a lower cost than traditional solid-state drives, unlimited write cycles compared to flash memory and it doesn't slow down over time. However, it has the disadvantages of the high cost compared to traditional hard drives like low capacity (4 GiB maximum), the transfer rate restricted by SATA 150 bus (1.5 Gbit/s). It is not physically compatible with all double-sided DDR RAM modules using heat spreaders due to tight spacing. Power loss causes data loss the battery can fail, potentially difficult to find a replacement battery. It adds to memory wiping data from all modules with no ECC support.

The i-RAM is bottlenecked by the SATA interface, which limits bandwidth to a maximum sustained throughput of 150 MB/s. This speed limitation is offset by near-instant access, with a latency of 0.1 ms.

DRAM is volatile, so power loss will cause data loss. The i-RAM is installed in a PCI slot, which powers it while the PC is plugged in (using standby power if the PC is off). It has a backup battery (10 to 16 hours depending on the configuration), which operates when the PC is not connected to AC mains power.

The i-RAM supports Unbuffered/Non-ECC DDR 200/266/333/400 MHz RAM modules of different capacities (up to 1 GiB), speeds, and brands for a maximum capacity of 4 GiB. Because of this, cost per GB is high, but the device offers a non-mechanical storage method with higher performance than a traditional hard drive.

i-RAM BOX 

The i-RAM BOX became available in August 2007. It is essentially a full-width, half-height drive bay implementation of the PCI revision 1.3 product. i-RAM Box's main difference lie in its half height 5.25" drive bay format that connects to a SATA port instead of the PCI bus. It uses a standard 24-pin ATX (motherboard) power cable for standby current (Y cable supplied) and a standard 4-pin Molex power connector. It has a fan header on the PCB and a slightly more spacious PCB layout.

Otherwise, it appears to be identical to the PCI version. It is unknown why this version based on the old PCI design was released rather than the second generation model shown in 2006. Design changes would have been minimal due to the programmable Xilinx Spartan chipset. Most pundits expected changes to support 2 GiB RAM modules (possibly DDR2) and most importantly SATA 3 Gbit/s.

Second Generation i-RAM
The second generation i-RAM, GC-RAMDISK, was on display at Computex 2006. Rather than using a PCI slot for powering the drive, Gigabyte had implemented the GC-RAMDISK as a 5.25" drive unit powered from a 4-pin Molex connector. The drive supports four DDR2 memory modules of up to 2 GiB for a total capacity of up to 8 GiB and the interface supports SATA 3.0 Gbit/s, which doubles the transfer rate compared to i-RAM.

Although this version of the I-RAM was displayed at Computex Taipei 2006, during the final revision it lost DDR2 and the higher capacity support. The released GC-RAMDISK still only supports up to DDR-400 with a total storage capacity of 4 GiB.

See also
RAM drive
Quiet PC
Solid-state drive
Hyperdrive (storage)

References

External links
Tech report review

Solid-state computer storage media